Konya Olympic Swimming Pool is an indoor Olympic-size swimming pool facility located in Konya, Turkey.

The Konya Ilympic Swimming Pool is located at Parsana neighborhood of Selçuklu district in Konya, Turkey. Built primarily to host the swimming events at the 2021 Islamic Solidarity Games, the swimming pool was opened on 21 July 2022. There are one Olympic-size (50 m), two short course (25 m) pools. Additionally, for training and diving events, the complex features a 20 m wide and 5 m deep pool with a diving tower of seven platforms. The sports venıe has a seating capacity of 1,000.

References

Swimming venues in Turkey
Sports venues in Konya
Indoor arenas in Turkey
Sports venues completed in 2022
2022 establishments in Turkey
Selçuklu District